Caribou County is a county located in the U.S. state of Idaho. As of the 2020 Census the county had a population of 7,027. The county seat and largest city is Soda Springs.

History
Robert Stuart explored the area of Soda Springs in 1812. Donald McKenzie also explored the area in 1819. The explorers were followed by trappers, missionaries, and emigrants that would travel through on the Oregon Trail. Soda Springs' namesake springs were an attraction for the trappers who met there to socialize on November 10, 1833. Missionaries and emigrant journal entries describing the springs date back to John K. Townsend's journal entry of July 8, 1834.

In May, 1863, members of the Morrisite religious sect took refuge at the junction of Soda Creek and Bear River where they formed Morristown. At the direction of General Patrick E. Conner, a fort was constructed in the fall of 1863 for their protection. Soda Springs was established as the county seat of Oneida County when it was created January 22, 1864, serving as the county seat until 1866. The 1870 census lists a population of 144 for Soda Springs. Settlement of the present town of Soda Springs occurred in May, 1871 when Brigham Young and other Mormons purchased land at the present site of Soda Springs. Young would often recreate on his property holdings there.

Settlement in the western portion of the county from Thatcher to Chesterfield was primarily ranching and farming operations up until 1880. Chester Call, Chesterfield's namesake arrived in 1880, bring his family in 1881. The towns of Chesterfield and Squaw Creek Station were settled in 1882. Squaw Creek Station was the initial name for Bancroft that was established when the railroad was built. It was renamed Bancroft on July 23, 1898. Settlement at the town of Grace commenced in 1893. Chesterfield declined in population while Grace and Bancroft endured.

All of present Caribou County became a part of Bingham County when it was created on January 13, 1885. The 1890 census lists four precincts of Chesterfield, Gentile Valley (now Thatcher), Little Blackfoot (now Henry), and Soda Springs with a combined population of 1,722. The Caribou precinct with 342 residents also contained residents within present-day Caribou County, but also included territory now in Bonneville County.

Bannock County was established on March 6, 1893. Bancroft, Chesterfield, Chubb Springs (now Henry), Gentile Valley (now Thatcher), Salt River (now Freedom), and Soda Springs were in existence at the 1900 census with a combined population of 3,430.

When the legislature formed Caribou County on February 11, 1919, Bannock County retained the Gem, Gentile Valley, and Upper Portneuf valleys. The retained area contained 4,486 residents at the 1920 Census, declining to 3,572 residents by the 1940 Census. On January 11, 1948, the residents of this area voted to become part of Caribou County.

Geography
The county's highpoint is Meade Peak at 9,963 ft (3036.8 m) above sea level.

Adjacent counties
Bonneville County - north
Lincoln County, Wyoming - east
Bear Lake County - south
Franklin County - south
Bannock County - west
Bingham County - northwest

National protected areas
 Cache National Forest (part)
 Caribou National Forest (part)
 Grays Lake National Wildlife Refuge (part)

Major highways
 US 30
 SH-34

Demographics

2000 census
As of the census of 2000, there were 7,304 people, 2,560 households, and 1,978 families living in the county. The population density was 4 people per square mile (2/km2). There were 3,188 housing units at an average density of 2 per square mile (1/km2). The racial makeup of the county was 96.14% White, 0.05% Black or African American, 0.21% Native American, 0.08% Asian, 0.12% Pacific Islander, 2.20% from other races, and 1.19% from two or more races. 3.96% of the population were Hispanic or Latino of any race. 29.7% were of English, 12.2% German, 11.0% American, 8.2% Danish and 5.5% Irish ancestry.

There were 2,560 households, out of which 39.60% had children under the age of 18 living with them, 69.30% were married couples living together, 5.20% had a female householder with no husband present, and 22.70% were non-families. 20.40% of all households were made up of individuals, and 10.30% had someone living alone who was 65 years of age or older. The average household size was 2.83 and the average family size was 3.29.

In the county, the population was spread out, with 31.70% under the age of 18, 8.20% from 18 to 24, 24.50% from 25 to 44, 22.00% from 45 to 64, and 13.60% who were 65 years of age or older. The median age was 35 years. For every 100 females there were 99.20 males. For every 100 females age 18 and over, there were 98.60 males.

The median income for a household in the county was $37,609, and the median income for a family was $42,630. Males had a median income of $38,575 versus $20,085 for females. The per capita income for the county was $15,179. About 7.00% of families and 9.60% of the population were below the poverty line, including 10.60% of those under age 18 and 9.90% of those age 65 or over.

2010 census
As of the 2010 United States Census, there were 6,963 people, 2,606 households, and 1,936 families living in the county. The racial makeup of the county was 95.3% white, 0.3% American Indian, 0.2% Pacific islander, 0.2% Asian, 0.1% black or African American, 2.3% from other races, and 1.5% from two or more races. Those of Hispanic or Latino origin made up 4.8% of the population. In terms of ancestry, 27.5% were English, 17.0% were German, 7.2% were Swedish, 7.0% were Danish, 5.0% were Irish, and 4.3% were American.

Of the 2,606 households, 35.0% had children under the age of 18 living with them, 64.3% were married couples living together, 6.1% had a female householder with no husband present, 25.7% were non-families, and 22.9% of all households were made up of individuals. The average household size was 2.64 and the average family size was 3.12. The median age was 37.7 years.

The median income for a household in the county was $44,958 and the median income for a family was $53,615. Males had a median income of $45,904 versus $23,837 for females. The per capita income for the county was $20,637. About 4.2% of families and 8.4% of the population were below the poverty line, including 10.4% of those under age 18 and 5.0% of those age 65 or over.

Communities

Cities
Bancroft
Grace
Soda Springs

Unincorporated communities
Conda
Freedom
Henry
Wayan

Politics
Like all of archconservative Mormon southeastern Idaho, Caribou County has been overwhelmingly Republican since the middle 1960s. The last Democrat to carry the county was Lyndon B. Johnson in 1964. In fact, in no presidential election subsequent to that landslide has any Democratic nominee cracked one-third of the county's vote.

See also
National Register of Historic Places listings in Caribou County, Idaho
County Parcel Map

References

 

 
Idaho placenames of Native American origin
1919 establishments in Idaho
Populated places established in 1919
Idaho counties